La musica che gira intorno is an Italian television musical variety broadcast in prime time on Rai 1 for two episodes on 15 and 22 January 2021 from Teatro 1 of Cinecittà World, conducted by Fiorella Mannoia.

Episodes

References 

2021 Italian television series debuts
Italian music television series
RAI original programming